Craig Andre Thyssen (born 25 March 1984 in Port Elizabeth) is a South African first class cricketer for the Warriors. He is a right-handed middle-order batsman and occasional right arm medium pace bowler. He achieved his highest first class score of 200 against the Chevrolet Knights (formerly Eagles) in Kimberly.

Career 
Craig Thyssen first made his debut in franchise cricket for the Chevrolet Knights (formerly Eagles). He was noted to be a special talent with his big hitting, athletic fielding and a useful bowler. However, Thyssen never pushed on his ability and was struggled to find a regular spot in the team.

Thyssen then moved to Port Elizabeth; his place of birth, and signed a contract with the Warriors. Since then, Thyssen has established himself as a pure limited overs cricketer and was selected to play in the Champions League T20 series in 2010.

He also plays for Penicuik Cricket Club in ESCA Championship in Scotland as player-cum-coach.

References

 

1984 births
Living people
Cricketers from Port Elizabeth
Border cricketers
Free State cricketers
South African cricketers
Eastern Province cricketers
Knights cricketers
Warriors cricketers
South African cricket coaches